A list of films produced in the United Kingdom in 1947:

See also
 1947 in British music
 1947 in British television
 1947 in the United Kingdom

References

External links
 

1947
1940s in British cinema
British
1947 in the United Kingdom